Michael T. Scifres (born October 8, 1980) is an American former professional football player who was a punter in the National Football League (NFL). He played the majority of his career with the San Diego Chargers and is included on the Chargers 50th Anniversary Team.

High school
Scifres attended Destrehan High School in Destrehan, Louisiana and lettered in football, soccer, and baseball. In football, he was an All-District selection. He was a teammate of former NFL player and member of the Pro Football Hall of Fame, Ed Reed, for two seasons. Scifres graduated from Destrehan High School in 1998.

College years
While playing for Western Illinois, Scifres was the only punter from NCAA Div 1-AA (now called the Football Championship Division) to become a 2002 finalist of the Ray Guy Award, given to the nation's top punter. He set a school and conference record with an 89-yard punt against Southwest Missouri State in 2000. Scifres also kicked a game-winning 56-yard field goal in his first career attempt in 1999.  Two-time First-team All-American selection by Football Gazette, Three-time All-conference selection, Seven-time National player of the week, and Five-time Conference player of the week. His college nickname was Scabies.  He graduated from Western Illinois University with a degree in Communications & Broadcasting.

Professional career

San Diego Chargers

Scifres was selected with the 14th pick of the fifth round of the 2003 NFL Draft out of Western Illinois University.

In the Chargers' 2009 Wild Card Playoff versus the Colts, Scifres kicked a 67-yard punt and averaged 51.7 yards with six punts. Also, all his punts during the game were inside the Colts' 20-yard line, with 4 inside their 10-yard line. Perhaps Scifres's best punt of the game was the last, a 52-yard kick launched from the San Diego 47 yard line that bounced out of bounds at the Colts' 1, pinning Indianapolis deep and allowing the Chargers' defense to force the Colts to punt the ball away from the back of their own end zone. Scifres said after the game, "I don't know if you can dream a game like this." Scifres also made some clutch punts near the end of the 2007 Chargers' AFC Divisional Playoff Game that pinned the Colts back deep in their own territory and ultimately helped thwart the Colts' QB Peyton Manning's come back attempts. In week 11 against the Denver Broncos Scifres completed his first NFL completion to Mike Tolbert for 28 yards.

Scifres boomed his way into the Chargers’ record books in 2012. Already the team’s record-holder for career punting average (45.3), Scifres was voted the team’s Special Teams Player of the Year last season after setting a new team record with an average of 48.3 yards per punt, a mark that shattered the previous high of 46.7, which he set back in 2010. And thanks to the Chargers’ outstanding coverage units, Scifres posted a 40.6-yard net average in 2012, second in the franchise’s 53-year history.

In 2014, U-T San Diego wrote that Scifres "arguably was the team MVP" in a Week 11 win over the Oakland Raiders after he landed punts on the Raiders' own 2-, 4-, 6-, 8- and 12-yard line. In a 23–14 loss in Week 14 to the New England Patriots, he suffered a clavicle fracture on a blocked punt, when his body was twisted mid-air and his shoulder landed hard on the ground. The Chargers placed him on injured reserve after he had season-ending surgery.

On April 30, 2016,  Scifres was released by the Chargers, who informed him that they were going to select punter Drew Kaser in the 2016 NFL draft that day.

Carolina Panthers
Scifres signed a one-year contract with the Carolina Panthers on June 7, 2016. He was released via injury settlement on August 31, 2016.

References

External links
Carolina Panthers bio

1980 births
Living people
People from Destrehan, Louisiana
People from Metairie, Louisiana
Players of American football from New Orleans
American football punters
Destrehan High School alumni
Western Illinois Leathernecks football players
San Diego Chargers players
Carolina Panthers players